Diana Frances (born Diana Frances Clent) is a Canadian comedian, writer, and business manager. She has written and performed comedy for stage, television and radio for three decades, and served as the managing director of the Vancouver-based Rock Paper Scissors comedy collective.  She has been nominated for a Gemini Award and nine Canadian Comedy Awards.

Early life and education

Diana Frances Clent moved from Langley to Maple Ridge, British Columbia, when she was 13, after what she later described as a "rather traumatic family shake-up". She was adopted and lived with her aunt and uncle while attending Maple Ridge Secondary School. She took drama courses and initially pursued dramatic Shakespearean acting, but was repeatedly cast in comedic roles and was thrilled by the audience response. She studied theatre at Douglas College. As she entered the entertainment business, she dropped her surname which she felt sounded like "a cartoon sound effect".

Career
Frances joined the Vancouver Theatresports League, where she learned improvisational techniques. Her quick wit gained her a place in the Rock Paper Scissors (RPS) comedy collective. In 1991, she replaced an actor in the RPS production A Twisted Christmas Carol, an improvisational play based around a framework of the Dickens classic. She returned to be a part of almost every seasonal production of the play to 2005, and later relaunched the play in 2014.

RPS attracted corporate clients and found steady work performing customized comedy for conferences and also offering workshops for employee relations. As managing director of RPS, Frances was named one of the "Forty Under 40" by Business in Vancouver magazine in 2003. Frances also performed with the Impolite Company (IMPCO) sketch collective, Urban Improv and Canadian Content.

In July 1997, Frances starred in the one-act musical comedy I'd Probably Be Famous. She directed a production of The Complete Works of William Shakespeare (Abridged) in January 1998, and staged a portion of the play as a song-and-dance number when she found that her actors could tap dance. In 2001 and 2002, she performed with RPS in the improvised musical Blankety Blank: The Unknown Musical  and Design For Living. In 2005, Frances began performing Leave it to Cleavage, an improv show she had developed with Ellie Harvie, in which their housewife characters provide 1950s-era solutions to modern problems posed by the audience. They were recognized with a 2004 Canadian Comedy Award nomination for Best Improv Troupe.

A demand for television programming came in the late 1990s with the launch of The Comedy Network, for which Frances wrote and starred in the sketch-comedy series Slightly Bent TV (1999) and Sucker Punch (2001–2002) and wrote for the 2002 satirical newsmagazine Point Blank. She wrote for CTV's Comedy Inc, and co-produced and performed in a comedy tour in support of its fifth season. She later wrote for This Hour Has 22 Minutes. Frances was nominated for a Gemini Award for writing for The Hour with George Stroumboulopoulos.

Frances has developed material for Vancouver and Victoria fringe festivals, and is credited with bringing improvisational comedy to the Yukon after insisting on an improv segment at the 2003 Nakai comedy festival. Organizers and audiences were so impressed that Frances was booked for full improv shows the following years and closed the 2007 festival with Leave it to Cleavage.

In 2004, Frances wrote a CBC Radio documentary about women in comedy. She has written and appeared on several episodes of The Debaters and Definitely Not the Opera, contributed to the sketch comedy show The Irrelevant Show, and served as a relationship columnist with her feature Dating Diana.

Frances performed with RPS on two tours for the Canadian Armed Forces: a one-month tour in 1997, visiting CFS Alert, Bosnia, Egypt, Israel, and CFB Goose Bay; and a nine-day tour of Afghanistan in 2003, performing at Camp Julien in Kabul and nearby Camp Warehouse. In 2018 and 2019, she toured with Elvira Kurt and Friends and Girls Nite Out. Frances wrote the 2018 ACTRA Awards in Toronto show, hosted by Colin Mochrie.

Frances was a judge on sketch-comedy television competition Sketch Troop alongside Harvie and Tim Progosh. She was a judge for the Vancouver leg of a twelve-city tour of Literary Death Match.

Selected works

Improv shows
A Twisted Christmas Carol with Rock Paper Scissors, seasonal 1991–2005, 2014
The X-Mas Files with Vancouver Theatresports, December 1996
Blankety Blank: The Unknown Musical with Rock Paper Scissors, April 2001, August 2002
Sword Play, Improv Outlet Co-op, August 2004
Leave it to Cleavage: The Original Desperate Housewives, with Ellie Harvie, January 2005
Canadian Content, with Urban Improv, September 2005

Scripted plays
I'd Probably Be Famous, July 1997
The Complete Works of William Shakespeare (Abridged), January 1998, as director
Design For Living with Rock Paper Scissors, April 2002
Canadian Mounties vs. Atomic Invaders with Canadian Content, September 2006

Television
Slightly Bent TV, 1999, writer/performer
Sucker Punch, 2001–2002, writer/performer
Sketch Troop, 2002, judge
Point Blank, 2002, writer
Comedy Inc, writer
This Hour Has 22 Minutes, writer

Radio
The Debaters, writer/performer
Definitely Not the Opera, writer/performer
The Irrelevant Show
Dating Diana, writer/host

Awards
Forty Under 40, Business in Vancouver, 2003.
Gemini Award nominee for Best Writing in an Information Program or Series, The Hour with George Stroumboulopoulos, 2009
Canadian Comedy Award nominee for Best Female Improviser, 2001, 2002, 2004, 2005, 2006, 2007, 2008, and 2015
Canadian Comedy Award nominee for Best Improv Group, Leave It To Cleavage, 2004
Writers Guild of Canada Screenwriting Awards, Sondra Kelly Award for Given Up, 2017

References

Living people
Canadian comedy writers
Canadian women comedians
Comedians from Vancouver
People from Langley, British Columbia (city)
People from Maple Ridge, British Columbia
Writers from Vancouver
Year of birth missing (living people)